Lotice Durrell Mock (November 10, 1929 – March 2, 1999) was an American football player and coach. He served as the head football coach at the Florence State University—now known as the University of North Alabama—from 1970 to 1972, compiling a record of 8–24. Prior to that, he was a high school football coach in the state of Alabama.

After retiring from coaching, he served as the Chief of Police at North Alabama's campus.

Head coaching record

College

References

External links
 

1929 births
1999 deaths
American football offensive linemen
North Alabama Lions football coaches
North Alabama Lions football players
High school football coaches in Alabama